The Australian Federation of Women Voters (AFWV) originally the Australian Womens Register in 1921 became the AFWV in 1924.

Also known as The Australian Federation of Women's Societies for Equal Citizenship it was founded as a national lobby group in the interests of women's rights post suffrage. It was "...for three decades it was in the vanguard of the progressive women's movement in Australia." The federation had an official publication, entitled The Dawn, which had existed from 1918.
Achievements of the Federation included: 
 Obtaining the representation of the first woman as an Australian delegate to the Assembly of the League of Nations in 1922
 Attaining the appointment of members of its affiliated groups to the League of Nations Assembly in 1928, 1935 and 1936. 
 In 1937 the Federation compiled a memorandum on the Status of Women, showing sex discrimination was endemic in Australian law.  The report was included as an annex to the report prepared by the Government on the same subject and forwarded to the Secretariat of the League of Nations.  In 1947 the Federation prepared a second document on the status of women.

Founding and governance
First discussed at the triennial Woman's Christian Temperance Union national conference in Perth in 1918, the Federation was established straight after the next gathering in Melbourne in 1921. Bessie Rischbieth (Western Australia) was elected president and Elizabeth Nicholls (South Australia), Annie Carvosso (Queensland) and Mary Jamieson Williams (New South Wales) were elected vice-presidents.

Later Presidents included social worker Amy Grace Wheaton who was President from 1951 to 1954.

The Federation existed until 1974, and was largely superseded by the Women's Electoral Lobby in 1972.

References

External links
  Australian Federation of Women Voters in The Encyclopedia of Women and Leadership in Twentieth-Century Australia
 Records of The Australian Federation of Women Voters in the National Library of Australia (finding aid)

Defunct organisations based in Australia
Feminist organisations in Australia
Organizations established in 1921
Women's rights in Australia
1921 establishments in Australia
1974 disestablishments in Australia